The East Lancs Myllennium was a type of single-decker bus body manufactured by East Lancashire Coachbuilders on DAF SB220, Dennis Dart SLF, MAN 14.220 and Scania OmniTown chassis.

It was designed in 1999 as a bus for Millennium Dome routes M1 and M2 operated by London Central, but soon after became available for other operators. It was superseded by the East Lancs Esteem in 2006

Operations

United Kingdom 
The bus has seen orders, the majority of them coming from Arriva North West and First Berkshire & The Thames Valley. Notable orders include London Central for routes M1 and M2, which its buses have been sold to Black Velvet Travel.

22 were bought in 2005-7 by Surrey County Council for contract use, initially for school contracts before moving onto park and ride routes. Enterprise had also bought two for contract use with Red Funnel in 2005, with them being handed down to Go South Coast division Bluestar once the contract with them was finished.

Guernsey 
CT Plus had bought around 30 short-width Myllenniums with the Dennis Dart SLF chassis between 2004 and 2005. These were later phased out in 2018 with Wright Streetvibes.

Hyline

The Hyline body was designed to re-body reconditioned Leyland Tiger and Volvo B10M chassis. The bus itself could seat up to 67 passengers.

Six Leyland Tigers were rebodied in 2000 as Myllennium Hylines for Strathtay. Two further orders were placed, both for Volvo B10M chassis. Looking rather different from the Strathtay examples, the Volvos was built with bonded glazing and had the emergency exit located at the very rear off side. The concept was not a great success, as a result no further orders followed - the Hylines representing the end in the United Kingdom of rebodying for the bus industry. It was built like the Myllennium single-decker but for high-floor buses and thus, it could not be ordered with any new, low floor chassis. The body was discontinued in 2002.

Special

In line with previous East Lancs products, the Myllennium bodywork was used to body less standard buses than public service vehicles. Notable examples include the BBC Radio buses, in various places around the United Kingdom.

Gallery

See also
East Lancs Myllennium Lolyne
East Lancs Myllennium Lowlander
East Lancs Myllennium Nordic
East Lancs Myllennium Vyking

Notes

References

External links

Myllennium
Full-size buses
Low-floor buses
Step-entrance buses
Vehicles introduced in 1999